Pietro Lippomano (died 1548) was a Roman Catholic prelate who served as Bishop of Verona (1544–1548) and Bishop of Bergamo (1516–1544).

Biography
On 1 Jul 1516, Pietro Lippomano was appointed during the papacy of Pope Leo X as Bishop of Bergamo.
On 29 Jun 1530, he was consecrated bishop by Gabriele Castelli, Titular Archbishop of Dariensis, with Mattia Ugoni, Bishop Emeritus of Famagusta, and Defendente Valvassori, Bishop of Capodistria, serving as co-consecrators. 
On 18 Feb 1544, he was appointed during the papacy of Pope Paul III as Bishop of Verona.
He served as Bishop of Verona until his death on 9 Aug 1548.

References

External links and additional sources
 (for Chronology of Bishops) 
 (for Chronology of Bishops) 
 (for Chronology of Bishops) 
 (for Chronology of Bishops) 

16th-century Roman Catholic bishops in the Republic of Venice
Bishops appointed by Pope Leo X
Bishops appointed by Pope Paul III
1548 deaths
Bishops of Bergamo